Toselli is an Italian surname. Notable people with the surname include:

 Angelo Toselli (c.1765–1827), Italian architect and scenographer, master of vedute
 Antonio Toselli (1884–1954), Italian engineer and politician
 Cristopher Toselli (born 1988), Chilean football goalkeeper
 Enrico Toselli (1883–1926), Italian pianist and composer
 Ignacio Toselli, Argentine film actor
 Bernard of Bologna (1701–1770, born Flovitano Toselli), theologian and author

Italian-language surnames